Turkish Bank Group is a banking corporation established during 1901 as the Nicosia Savings Box in Cyprus to assist businesses by providing capital and financial support for local tradesmen. Supervised by the custodian Hacı İbrahim Efendi and led by an established businessman of the area Mufti Hafiz Ziyai Efendi.

By 1925 it had been turned into a savings bank, and by 1974 (as Türk Bankası Ltd./Turkish Bank Ltd.) established branches in London. As of 2013, the bank is operating with branches in Haringay, Dalston, Edmonton, Lewisham and Palmers Green, along with headquarters and main branch located on Borough High Street near London Bridge.

Then in 1982, it opened its first branches on mainland Turkey, and in 1993 it issued its first credit cards.

It now operates under several names:
Turkish Bank A.Ş. as a private bank - alongside Turkish Yatırım A.Ş as an investment brokerage service.
Allied Turkish Bank as an offshore bank in Northern Cyprus
Türk Bankası Ltd. as a retail bank (19 branches) in Northern Cyprus
Turkish Bank (UK) Ltd. in the UK
Turkish Factoring (Turkey) as a factoring company
Turkish Leasing (Turkey) as a leasing company

Turkish Bank Group established its presence in Turkey by opening a branch of Turk Bankası Ltd. In Istanbul in 1982. In 1988, a second branch in Izmir became operational. Next year, two more branches in Mersin and Ankara followed suit.

Turkish operations of the group were reorganized under a new separate entity when Turkish Bank A.Ş. was formed as an incorporated company at the end of 1991. In January 2008, paid-up capital reached 80 million Turkish lira.

In 2004 Levent; in 2005 Abdi İpekçi Private Banking; in 2006 Bayrampaşa, Adapazarı branches; in 2007 Pangaltı, Antalya, Ostim and Eskişehir; in 2008 Pendik and İstanbul corporate branches were opened. Currently, Turkish Bank has 19  locations within Turkey.

Turkish Bank is known in Turkey as being one of the most liquid banks.

Turkish Bank successfully becoming an independent member of the major UK payments schemes such as Bacs and Faster Payments. Another development was Türk Bankası Ltd., the group's Cypriot bank, signing a €5 million trade facilitation programme with the European Bank for Reconstruction and Development (EBRD).

External links
Official Site
Turkish Bank A.Ş website
Turkish Bank (UK) Ltd website
Türk Bankası Ltd. website
Turkish Invest/Yatırım website
Turkish Invest/Yatırım website 
Turkish Leasing website 
Turkish Factoring website 
Allied Turkish Bank IBU website

Banks of Turkey
Companies based in Istanbul
Banks of Northern Cyprus
Banks established in 1901
Turkish brands
1901 establishments in Cyprus